Carex tenera, known as quill sedge, is a species of sedge native to the northern United States and Canada.

Two varieties are recognized in Flora of North America:
 C. tenera var. tenera
 C. tenera var. echinodes (= Carex echinodes (Fernald) P.Rothr., Reznicek & Hipp)

References

tenera
Plants described in 1824
Flora of North America